Below are lists of records of the German football club FC Schalke 04.

Player records
 First / Last: year of the first / last competitive appearance for Schalke
 Seasons (Sea): number of seasons in which the player made at least one competitive appearance for Schalke
 Position (Pos): GK = Goalkeeper, DF = Defender, MF = Midfielder, FW = Forward

Bundesliga era
Statistics include all competitive matches since the formation of the Bundesliga in August 1963. Players who are still active for Schalke 04 are shown in bold.

 BL = Bundesliga (1963–1981, 1982–83, 1984–1988, 1991–2021, 2022–)
 2.BL = 2. Bundesliga (1981–82, 1983–84, 1988–1991, 2021–2022)
 Cup = DFB-Pokal (1963–)
 EC = European competitions: Champions League (2001–2019), UEFA Cup / Europa League (1976–2017), Cup Winners' Cup (1969–1973)
 OtC = Other competitions: Supercup (2010, 2011), Ligapokal (1972–73, 1998–2007), UI Cup (2003, 2004), Bundesliga Relegation play-offs (1983)

Statistics correct .

Most appearances
Players are sorted by number of total appearances, then by number of Bundesliga appearances.

Top goalscorers
Numbers in brackets indicate appearances made. Players are sorted by number of total goals, then by goals per game (Ø).

Other records
Youngest and oldest
 Youngest player: Volker Abramczik – 17 years, 95 days (30 August 1981, DFB-Pokal)
 Youngest league player: Olaf Thon – 17 years, 96 days (5 August 1983, 2. Bundesliga)
 Youngest Bundesliga player: Julian Draxler – 17 years, 117 days (15 January 2011)
 Youngest goalscorer: Julian Draxler – 17 years, 127 days (25 January 2011, DFB-Pokal)
 Youngest league goalscorer: Olaf Thon – 17 years, 132 days (10 September 1983, 2. Bundesliga)
 Youngest Bundesliga goalscorer: Julian Draxler – 17 years, 193 days (1 April 2011)
 Oldest player: Klaus Fichtel – 43 years, 184 days (21 May 1988, Bundesliga, also league record)
 Oldest goalscorer: Klaas-Jan Huntelaar – 37 years, 276 days (15 May 2021, Bundesliga)
Goals
 Most goals in a season in all competitions: Klaas-Jan Huntelaar – 48 (2011–12)
 Most league goals in a season: Simon Terodde – 30 (2021–22, 2. Bundesliga)
 Most Bundesliga goals in a season: Klaus Fischer – 29 (1975–76), Klaas-Jan Huntelaar – 29 (2011–12)
 Most goals scored in a match: Klaus Scheer  – 5 (1 September 1971, Bundesliga)
 Most penalty goals scored: Ingo Anderbrügge – 28 (of 33, 20 of 25 in Bundesliga)
Goalkeeping
 Most clean sheets: Norbert Nigbur – 133 (96 in Bundesliga)
 Most consecutive minutes without conceding a goal: Jens Lehmann – 597 (30 November 1996 – 15 March 1997, Bundesliga)
 Most penalties saved: Norbert Nigbur – 18 (of 51, 16 of 42 in Bundesliga)
Internationals
 Most international caps as a Schalke 04 player: Jiří Němec – 64 (1994 – 2001, Czech Republic)
 Most international caps for Germany as a Schalke 04 player: Benedikt Höwedes – 44 (2011 – 2017)
 Most international goals as a Schalke 04 player: Klaas-Jan Huntelaar – 26 (2010 – 2015, Netherlands)
 Most international goals for Germany as a Schalke 04 player: Klaus Fischer – 23 (1977 – 1981)
 World Cup winners: Benedikt Höwedes (2014, appeared in final), Julian Draxler (2014), Norbert Nigbur (1974, did not play), Helmut Kremers (1974, did not play)
 European Championship winners: Erwin Kremers (1972, appeared in final), Bent Christensen (1992, Denmark)
Transfers
 Highest transfer fee paid: Breel Embolo – €26.5 million (2016)
 Highest transfer fee received: Leroy Sané – €52.0 million (2016)

Pre-Bundesliga era
Statistics include all competitive matches from 1920 until 1963, except if a player ended his Schalke 04 career after 1963, then all his matches are considered.

 GLW = Gauliga Westfalen (1933–1945)
 OLW = Oberliga West (1947–1963)
 OtL = Other leagues: Emscher-Kreisliga (1921–1926), Gauliga Ruhr (1926–1933), Landesliga Westfalen (1945–1947), Bundesliga (1963–)
 GC = German championship (1927–1962)
 Cup = Tschammer-Pokal (1935–1943), DFB-Pokal (1952–)
 EC = European competitions: European Cup (1958–59), Cup Winners' Cup (1969–70)
 OtC = Other competitions: Western German championship (1927–1933), Westphalian Cup (1943–1944), British zone championship (1947), Oberliga relegation play-offs (1949), Western German Cup (1953–1963), i.a.

Most appearances

Top goalscorers

Other records
Youngest and oldest
 Youngest player: Otto Schrader – 15 years, 331 days (21 March 1937, Gauliga Westfalen)
 Youngest goalscorer:  Otto Schrader – 15 years, 331 days (21 March 1937, Gauliga Westfalen)
 Oldest player: Ernst Kuzorra – 43 years, 92 days (16 January 1949, Oberliga West)
 Oldest goalscorer: Ernst Kuzorra – 41 years, 333 days (14 September 1947, Oberliga West)

Goals
 Most goals in a season in all competitions: Hermann Eppenhoff – 42 (1940–41)
 Most league goals in a season: Ernst Kuzorra – 34 (1929–30, Gauliga Ruhr)
 Most Gauliga Westfalen goals in a season: Hermann Eppenhoff – 28 (1940–41)
 Most Oberliga West goals in a season: Hans Kleina – 23 (1950–51)
 Most German championship goals in a season: Hermann Eppenhoff – 13 (1941)
 Most goals scored in a match: Herbert Burdenski – 8 (23 February 1947, Landesliga Westfalen)
 Most goals scored in a German championship match: Ernst Kalwitzki – 5 (18 June 1939, final)
Internationals
 First international cap as a Schalke 04 player: Ernst Kuzorra – 20 November 1927
 Most international caps as a Schalke 04 player: Fritz Szepan – 34 (1929 – 1939)
 Most international goals as a Schalke 04 player: Adolf Urban – 11 (1935 – 1942)
 World Cup winner: Bernhard Klodt (1954)

All time

Most appearances

Top goalscorers

Manager records 
Most matches managed

Bundesliga era
BL = Bundesliga, 2.BL = 2. Bundesliga, Cup = DFB-Pokal, EC = European competitions, OtC = Other competitions (Supercup, Ligapokal)

Pre-Bundesliga era
OLW = Oberliga West, GWL = Gauliga Westfalen, Cup = DFB-Pokal, GC = German championship, EC = European Cup

Team records

Bundesliga era
Matches
Record league win: 7–0 vs. FC Bayern Munich (a), Bundesliga, 9 October 1976
Record league home win: 6–0 each vs. SpVgg Bayreuth, 24 October 1981; SC Freiburg, 29 October 1983 and Darmstadt 98, 10 March 1984; all 2. Bundesliga
Record Bundesliga home win: 6–1 each vs. Kickers Offenbach, 4 October 1972; Fortuna Köln, 2 March 1974 and Borussia Dortmund, 10 December 1985
Record league home goals scored: 7–4 vs. Bayer Leverkusen, 11 Februar 2006
Record DFB-Pokal win: 11–1 vs. FC Teningen (a), 31 July 2011
Record DFB-Pokal final win: 5–0 each vs. 1. FC Kaiserslautern, 1 July 1972 and MSV Duisburg, 21 May 2011
Record European win: 6–1 vs. HJK Helsinki (h), Europa League, 25 August 2011
Record Champions League win: 4–0 vs. RCD Mallorca (a), 16 October 2001
Record Revierderby win: 6–1 vs. Borussia Dortmund (h), Bundesliga, 10 December 1985
Record defeat: 0–11 vs. Borussia Mönchengladbach (a), Bundesliga, 7 January 1967
League
Most league wins in a season: 24 (Bundesliga, 1971–72, 34 games)
Most league goals scored in a season: 95 (2. Bundesliga, 1983–84, 38 games)
Most Bundesliga goals scored in a season: 77 (1976–77, 34 games)
Fewest league goals conceded in a season: 29 (2. Bundesliga, 1990–91, 38 games)
Fewest Bundesliga goals conceded in a season: 31 each (2005–06 and 2009–10, 34 games)
Most consecutive league wins: 6 each (Bundesliga, 2004–05 md 7–12, 2006–07 md 16–21, 2017–18 md  23–28 and 2. Bundesliga, 1990–91 md 3–8)
Most consecutive league matches without a defeat: 14 (Bundesliga, 1976–77 md 29 – 1977–78 md 8)
Most consecutive league matches without a defeat within a season: 13 each (Bundesliga, 1997–98 md 16–28 and 2006–07 md 10–22)
Most consecutive league matches without a win: 30 (Bundesliga, 2019–20 md 19 – 2020–21 md 14)

Pre-Bundesliga era
Matches
Record league win: 20–0 vs. SpVgg Herten (a), Landesliga Westfalen, 23 February 1947
Record league home win: 15–1 vs. Union Recklinghausen, Gauliga Westfalen, 16 February 1936
Record Oberliga West win: 8–0 vs. Borussia Mönchengladbach (h), 24. September 1950
Record German championship win: 16–0 vs. CSC 03 Kassel (h), 16 June 1940
Record German championship final win: 9–0 vs. Admira Vienna (in Berlin), 18. June 1939
Record DFB-Pokal win: 13–0 vs. VfvB Alsum (a), 20. August 1939
Record European win: 5–2 vs. KB Copenhagen (h), European Cup, 18 September 1958
Record Revierderby win: 10–0 vs. Borussia Dortmund (h), Gauliga Westfalen, 20 October 1940

League
Most league wins in a season: 21 (Gauliga Westfalen, 1940–41, 22 games)
Most league goals scored in a season: 103 (Gauliga Westfalen, 1936–37, 18 games)
Fewest league goals conceded in a season: 10 each (Gauliga Westfalen, 1934–35, 1937–38, 1941–42 and 1943–44, 18 games each)
Most consecutive league wins: 26 (Gauliga Westfalen, 1935–36 md 4 – 1936–37 md 11)
Most consecutive league wins with a season: 16 (Gauliga Westfalen, 1942–43 md 3–18)
Most consecutive league matches without a defeat: 84 (Gauliga Westfalen, 1934–35 md 18 – 1939–40 md 11)

Honours

See also
 List of FC Schalke 04 players
 List of FC Schalke 04 managers
 List of FC Schalke 04 seasons
 FC Schalke 04 in European football

Sources
 
 
 

Records
Schalke 04